Nicola Holt is an English former cricketer who played as a bowler. She appeared in two One Day Internationals for England against New Zealand in June 1996. She played domestic cricket for Yorkshire.

References

External links
 
 

Year of birth missing (living people)
Place of birth missing (living people)
Living people
England women One Day International cricketers
Yorkshire women cricketers